Sven Tore Nylund (October 5, 1894 – July 2, 1975) was a Swedish diver who competed in the 1912 Summer Olympics. He finished fifth in his first round heat of the 3 metre springboard event and did not advance to the final.

References 

1894 births
1975 deaths
Swedish male divers
Olympic divers of Sweden
Divers at the 1912 Summer Olympics